Infamy and the Breed is the debut album by Swedish melodic death metal band, Zonaria. This album was recorded at Black Lounge studios, Avesta, Sweden with Per Nilson and Jonas Kjellgren of Scar Symmetry.

Track listing
 "Infamy" - 1:39
 "The Last Endeavor" - 3:27
 "Pandemic Assault" - 3:48
 "The Armageddon Anthem" - 3:43
 "Rendered in Vain" - 4:16
 "Image of Myself" - 4:20
 "Evolution Overdose" - 4:03
 "Attending Annihilation" feat. Christian Älvestam of Scar Symmetry - 3:34
 "Descend Into Chaos" - 3:43
 "Ravage the Breed" - 4:25
 "The Black Omen" - 4:54
 "Everything Is Wasteland" - 4:46
 "Misery Dive (Japanese Bonus Track)"

Credits
Jonas Kjellgren - Mixing/Mastering
Per Nilson - Producer
Christian Älvestam - guest vocals
Simon Berglund – vocals, lead guitar
Emil Nyström – guitar
Jerry Ekman – bass
Emanuel Isaksson – drums
Artwork by Seth (Rotting Christ, Vader, Decapitated)

Release history

External links
 

2007 debut albums
Zonaria albums